Catherine Winifred "Kate" Dwyer (13 June 1861 – 3 February 1949) was an Australian educator, suffragist, and labour activist.

Life
Dwyer née Golding was born at Tambaroora, Wellington County, New South Wales to Joseph Golding (died 1890), a gold-miner from Galway, Ireland, and his Scottish wife, Ann (died 1906; née Fraser). She was educated at Hill End Public School.

In 1880 she began teaching at Tambaroora Public School, she taught at numerous public primary school in New South Wales until she married fellow school teacher Michael Dwyer in 1887. From 1894 they lived in Sydney where Kate became a member of the Womanhood Suffrage League of New South Wales, her sisters, Annie and Belle were also members.

She was a founder of the Women's Progressive Association in 1901, the organisation promoted the entry of women into legal professions and equal benefits for women following divorce. Interested in women's working conditions she also founded the Women Workers' Union for home and fringe factory workers. She was active in the "no conscription" during World War I. In 1916 Dwyer was the first woman in Australia to be elected a member of the Senate of the University of Sydney. In that capacity in 1918 she moved a resolution to support the introduction of legislation for women to enter the legal profession. In May 1921 she was one of the first 61 women to be appointed justices of the peace in New South Wales.

Dwyer died on 3 February 1949 in Sydney, New South Wales, Australia.

Legacy
Dwyer Street in Cook, a suburb of Canberra, is named in her honour.

See also
 List of suffragists and suffragettes

References

1861 births
1949 deaths
Australian suffragists
Australian educators
People from New South Wales
Australian people of Irish descent
Australian people of Scottish descent
19th-century Australian women
20th-century Australian women